Jadi Burek is a television show from North Macedonia hosted by Janko Ilkovski, The show is on air every weekday on TV Sonce.

Season 2015/2016

Season 2014/2015

This list in not complete

Season 2013/2014

This list in not complete

Season 2012/2013

This list in not complete

Season 2011/2012

Season 2010/2011

Season 2009/2010

Season 2008/2009

Season 2007/2008

See also
Milenko Nedelkovski Show
Vo Centar
Eden na Eden
Ednooki

External links
 Official You Tube Channel

References

Macedonian television series